Arnaldo Zocchi (20 September 1862 – 17 July 1940) was a noted Italian sculptor of the late 19th and early 20th century. He was born in Florence and died in Rome.  He studied sculpture in Florence under his father Emilio Zocchi.

Works

Italy
Four Winged Victories at the Monument of Vittorio Emanuele II n Rome (co-work with three other sculptors)
Monument to Garibaldi in Bologna (1901)
Monument to Michelangelo in Caprese Michelangelo (1911)
Monument to the Martyrs of the Altamuran Revolution
 Monument to the Fallen in World War I, (piazza Zanardelli, Altamura)
Monument to the Fallen in Sarteano
Monument to the Fallen in World War I in Nomentano, Rome (1938)
Monument to Manuel Belgrano in Genoa (1927)
Monument to Piero della Francesca in Sansepolcro (1892)
Monument to Christopher Columbus in Lavagna (1930)

Bulgaria
Demeter Fountain in Plovdiv (1891),
Monument of Liberty in Rousse (1900s)
Monument to the Tsar Liberator in Sofia (1907)
Various works in Sevlievo (1894), Lovech,  Oryahovo (1903), the Dryanovo Monastery and Vidin (1911)

Rest of world
Monument to Christopher Columbus in Buenos Aires, Argentina (1921)
Monument to Saint Francis of Assisi in Cairo, Egypt
Monument to General Lafayette in Haverhill, Massachusetts, USA

Gallery

References

External links
 
 

1862 births
1940 deaths
Sculptors from Florence
20th-century Italian sculptors
20th-century Italian male artists
19th-century Italian sculptors
Italian male sculptors
19th-century Italian male artists